The Associated Screen News of Canada (ASN) was incorporated in 1920 by the Canadian Pacific Railway in Montreal. Ben Norrish, who formerly worked for the Canadian Government Motion Picture Bureau, was appointed its director. In the period from 1921 to 1958 ASN, the largest private film production company in Canada of the first half of the 20th century, produced the majority of newsreels, shorts and industrial films in Canada. In addition to commissioned films, ASN produced films for theatrical release, out of which came the celebrated Canadian Cameo series (from 1932 to 1954). This series of 85 theatrical short films was totally the creation of Gordon Sparling. It represented Canada's only creative film effort in the 1930s. Each film was approximately 10 minutes in length and covered a range of subject matter, ranging from sport, to historical compilations about Canada, and Canadians, to portraits and aspects of Canadian life and activities.

Films 

 Championship Wrestling (1932),
 The Pathfinder (1932),
 Carnival on Skates (1930),
 Shadow River (1933),
 Rhapsody in Two Languages (1934),
 The Kinsmen (1937),
 Music from the Stars (1938),
 Royal Banners over Ottawa (1940, colour),
 Skiways (1940, colour),
 Ten Thousand Days (1942),
 Spitzmarks the Spot (1948),
 Ski in the Sky (1949, colour),
 Rocky Eden (1949, colour),
 All about Emily (1949),
 Cowboy's Holiday (1950, colour),
 The Great Divide (1951, colour),
 Royal Welcome (1951, colour),
 The Beloved Fish (1954, colour)

References

External links 
Associated Screen News at the Canadian Educational, Sponsored, and Industrial Film (CESIF) Project, Concordia University

1920 establishments in Quebec
Canadian Pacific Railway subsidiaries
Newsreels
Mass media companies of Canada